The 1927 Combined Scottish Universities by-election was a by-election held from 26 to 29 April 1927 for the Combined Scottish Universities, a university constituency of the British House of Commons.

Vacancy 
The seat had become vacant on 16 March 1927 when the Unionist Member of Parliament (MP) Sir Henry Craik, Bt. had died, aged 80. He had held the seat since its creation for the 1918 general election, having previously been MP for Glasgow and Aberdeen Universities.

Candidates 
Two candidates contested the by-election. John Buchan, the novelist, of the Unionist Party and Hugh Guthrie of the Labour Party, who had contested Glasgow Camlachie at the 1918 general election.

Result 
The result was a victory for Buchan, who won nearly 88% of the votes.  He held the seat until 1935, when he resigned to take up the post of Governor General of Canada.

Votes

See also
Combined Scottish Universities (UK Parliament constituency)
1934 Combined Scottish Universities by-election
1935 Combined Scottish Universities by-election
1936 Combined Scottish Universities by-election
1938 Combined Scottish Universities by-election
1945 Combined Scottish Universities by-election
1946 Combined Scottish Universities by-election
List of United Kingdom by-elections (1918–1931)

Sources 

1927 in Scotland
1920s elections in Scotland
1927 elections in the United Kingdom
By-elections to the Parliament of the United Kingdom in the Combined Scottish Universities
Higher education in Scotland